James H. Lamb House is a historic plantation house and complex located near Garland, Sampson County, North Carolina.   The house was built about 1835, and is a -story, side hall plan, Greek Revival style frame dwelling.  Also on the property are a number of contributing resources including a mule barn, smokehouse, wash house, dairy, corn crib, garage / carriage house, tobacco barns, she, and a family cemetery.

It was added to the National Register of Historic Places in 1986.

References

Plantation houses in North Carolina
Houses on the National Register of Historic Places in North Carolina
Farms on the National Register of Historic Places in North Carolina
Greek Revival houses in North Carolina
Houses completed in 1835
Houses in Sampson County, North Carolina
National Register of Historic Places in Sampson County, North Carolina